Mariusz Marcin Sacha (born 19 July 1987) is a Polish former footballer.

Career

Club
In July 2011, he moved to his previous club Podbeskidzie Bielsko-Biała on a two-year contract.

National team
He represented Poland at the 2006 UEFA U-19 Championship, the FIFA U-20 World Cup.

References

External links
 

1987 births
Living people
Polish footballers
Poland under-21 international footballers
Poland youth international footballers
Podbeskidzie Bielsko-Biała players
MKS Cracovia (football) players
Polonia Bytom players
Sportspeople from Bielsko-Biała
Association football midfielders